"We the People" is the opening phrase of the Preamble to the United States Constitution and the Preamble to the Constitution of India.

We the People may also refer to:

Politics and government
 We the People: The Citizen and the Constitution, an activity sponsored by the Center for Civic Education
 We the People Act, a bill proposed in the US House of Representatives
 We the People Foundation, a tax-protest organization
 We the People Reform Movement, a political initiative in Belize
 We the People (petitioning system), an online petitioning mechanism sponsored by the US federal government
 "We the Peoples", the opening expression of the Preamble to the United Nations Charter

Film and television
 We the People (Indian TV series), an Indian discussion programme
 We the People (American TV series), a CBS Television program from 1948 to 1952
 We the People, a film directed by Brent Huff
 We the People (2021 TV series), a Netflix animated musical series produced by Barack and Michelle Obama
 We the People (court show), a courtroom series first hosted by Gloria Allred and soon hosted by Lauren Lake

Books
 We the People, a children's book about the writing of the United States Constitution by Lynne Cheney
 We, the People the Drama of America, a 1932 Marxist history of the US by Leo Huberman

Music
 We the People (band), an Orlando, Florida-based garage rock band from the 1960s

Albums
 We the People (Adrenaline Mob album), 2017
 We the People (Ellen McIlwaine album), 1973
 We the People (Flipsyde album), 2005
 We the People (Guitar Shorty album), 2006
 We the People by Ken Tamplin, 1995
 We the People (The Soul Searchers album), 1972
 We the People, Volume 1 by Colt Ford, 2019
 We the People by Ray Stevens, 2010

Songs
 "We the People", anthem of WorldPride 2023, by Electric Fields
 "We the People....", by A Tribe Called Quest
 "We the People", by Mudvayne from The New Game
 "We the People", by Megadeth from TH1RT3EN
 "We the People", by Billy Ray Cyrus from his 2000 album Southern Rain
 "We the People", by Colt Ford from his 2019 album We the People, Volume 1
 "We the People", by Kid Rock from his 2022 album Bad Reputation

Other uses
 We the People, a play by Eric Schlosser about the writing of the US Constitution
 We the People (boardgame), a board wargame about the American Revolution
Wrestler Jake Hager used this as a slogan during his wrestling career in WWE